Ripon Lodge, located near the village of Rippon, West Virginia, was built in 1833 by Henry S. Turner on his "Wheatland" estate. The next year his son, William F. Turner, inherited Ripon Lodge. The house is a two-story T-shaped stone building with a detached -story stone summer kitchen.  The interior contains an elegant half-spiral curving stairway to the second floor.

The Lodge was added to the National Register of Historic Places in 1984.

References

Houses on the National Register of Historic Places in West Virginia
Houses in Jefferson County, West Virginia
Federal architecture in West Virginia
Neoclassical architecture in West Virginia
National Register of Historic Places in Jefferson County, West Virginia
Houses completed in 1833
Historic districts in Jefferson County, West Virginia
Historic districts on the National Register of Historic Places in West Virginia